Tilavalli  is a village in the southern state of Karnataka, India. It is located in the Hangal taluk of Haveri district in Karnataka. Shanteshwara temple is built by a famous architecture shri jakanacharya, They are lot of monuments near to this place supports Lord rama visit to this place.

Demographics
As of 2001 India census, Tilavalli had a population of 6629 with 3378 males and 3251 females.
Tilavalli is also famous for its ayurvedic medicine.

This town also contains a temple called SRI SHANTESHWARA with the ancient scriptures. This also stands as an example for Indian Architecture.

See also
 Haveri
 Districts of Karnataka

References

External links
 
 http://Haveri.nic.in/

Villages in Haveri district